Meshik (also Romanized as Meshīk; also known as Mīshīk) is a village in Anzal-e Jonubi Rural District, Anzal District, Urmia County, West Azerbaijan Province, Iran. At the 2006 census, its population was 165, in 33 families.

References 

Populated places in Urmia County